Damavand, also known as Jamaran-2 and Velayat, was the second ship of the Iranian  of frigates and the flagship of the northern fleet. It was named Damavand after inauguration in the Caspian Sea. She sank on 28 January 2018, after hitting the breakwater at Bandar-e Anzali on 10 January.

Design and construction
On 23 February 2010, the Iranian media reported that the production of the ship had commenced. The ship has the ability to carry helicopters, anti-ship missiles, surface-to-air missiles, torpedoes, modern guns and air defence guns. The vessel is also equipped with electronic warfare devices.

The warship uses a new modern flat-type, phased array radar, which was being tested in 2011. The development of this new device took more than it was anticipated and delayed the launch of the vessel to March 2013. The fire control radar is also replaced by a modern radar dome. New sensors, e-warfare devices and radars are also installed on the vessel, further enhancing its capabilities. The frigate has a central attack and warfare management command control system integrated inside its systems, allowing the ship to track 100 surface, sub-surface, and air targets simultaneously and choose the best in-order to attack them.

Service history
Damavand, previously known as Velayat, was launched in March 2013 in the Caspian Sea near the northern port city of Bandar-Anzali. Damavand tested its engines and performed a SAT test in the Caspian Sea from 16 to 17 July 2014. Damavand officially joined the Navy on 9 March 2015.

On 10 January 2018 Damavand was based out of Bandar-Anzali on the Caspian Sea. It is believed probable that the incident was the result of navigational error, affected by a strong storm in the area which creating high wave heights and low visibility in the area. During the incident six members of the ship's crew fell overboard. Four of those crew members were later rescued, two are currently considered missing by media sources. The Iranian Navy declined to confirm the reporting. There has been little information released in reference to the cause of the grounding, with exception to statements of wave height and visibility caused by the storm at the time of the grounding.

A video circulated in the Iranian media shows Damavand had fully sunk in the Caspian Sea a couple of weeks after it suffered damages during the stormy weather of Anzali Port. This will possibly result in the ship being struck from the active commission list of Moudge-class frigates.

On 5 August 2019, Rear Admiral Hossein Khanzadi, Commander of the Islamic Republic of Iran Navy, was quoted (by Jane's Defence Weekly) as saying, "The destroyer has been fully revived and this has been done in 18 months." The admiral also said that the ship would be returned to service before the end of the current year (of the Iranian calendar; 19 March 2020). However, the hull of a similar ship has been seen in satellite images, being built at the Caspian Sea port of Bandar-e Anzali.

In popular culture 
Iranian singer-songwriter Amir Tataloo filmed music video of his song Energy Hastei aboard Damavand, that became viral amidst the Joint Comprehensive Plan of Action.

See also

 List of frigates of Iran

References

2013 ships
Maritime incidents in 2018
Moudge-class frigates
Ships built at Shahid Tamjidi shipyard
January 2018 events in Asia
2018 in Iran